Convexella is a genus of corals belonging to the family Primnoidae, first described by Frederick Bayer in 1996.

Species from WoRMS:
Convexella divergens 
Convexella jungerseni 
Convexella krampi 
Convexella magelhaenica 
Convexella murrayi 
and from the Australian Faunal Directory:
Convexella vanhoeffeni

References

External links
Concexella: images & occurrence data from GBIF

Primnoidae
Octocorallia genera
Taxa named by Frederick Bayer
Taxa described in 1996